The Southeastern Conference Pitcher of the Year is a baseball award given to the Southeastern Conference's most outstanding pitcher. The award was first given following the 2003 season. It is selected by the league's head coaches, who are not allowed to vote for their own players.

Key

Winners

Winners by school

References

Awards established in 1993
Pitcher
NCAA Division I baseball conference players of the year